The Pilana Raja Maha Vihara or Pilana Temple is a Buddhist temple in Galle, Sri Lanka. The Chief Incumbent (Chief Priest) is Meepe Wagira Thera. The temple is well known in the southern part of the island for its historical Perahera festival.

Location
The temple is situated on a small hill surrounded by paddy fields, and is visible from the Galle–Akuressa Highway.

References 

Religious buildings and structures in Galle
Buddhist temples in Galle District